IV liga (Czwarta Liga) is the fifth level of the Polish football league system. The current structure of IV liga was created in season 2000/01 after introducing new  administrative division of Poland. 16 clubs, one from each voivodeship (province), are promoted to III liga. The bottom clubs are relegated to Liga okręgowa or V liga (depending on the voivodeship).

Until the end of the 2007/08 season IV liga lay at fourth tier of league system but this was changed with the formation of the Ekstraklasa as the highest level of football league in Poland.

Groups
In 2019/20 season, there are 20 parallel groups of IV liga. There are two groups in 4 voivodeships but only one club can be promoted after winning the play-offs between the winners of these two groups.
 dolnośląska (Lower Silesia) - 2 groups
 kujawsko-pomorska (Cuyavia-Pomerania)
 lubelska (Lublin)
 lubuska (Lubusz)
 łódzka (Łódź)
 małopolska (Lesser Poland) - 2 groups
 mazowiecka (Mazovia) - 2 groups
 opolska (Opole)
 podkarpacka (Subcarpathia)
 podlaska (Podlasie)
 pomorska (Pomerania)
 śląska (Silesia) - 2 groups
 świętokrzyska (Holy Cross)
 warmińsko-mazurska (Warmia-Masuria)
 wielkopolska (Greater Poland)
 zachodniopomorska (West Pomerania)

References

 
5
Poland
Professional sports leagues in Poland